Matinicus Rock Light is a lighthouse on Matinicus Rock, a windswept rock  off the coast of Maine. It is one of eleven seacoast lights off the coast of Maine.  First established in 1827, the present surviving structures date to 1857.  The lighthouse was added to the National Register of Historic Places as Matinicus Rock Light Station on March 14, 1988.

Description
Matinicus Rock is a windswept and treeless rock, projecting out of the Gulf of Maine several miles south of the main islands of Matinicus Isle, Maine, an island community that is a  ferry ride from Rockland. The light station occupies the center of the rock, and includes two towers, a keeper's house, shed, and boathouse. The dock is located on the northwest side of the rock. Only the southern one is active, and has a twelve-sided lantern house, while the other has lost its lantern house. Connected to the active tower is the keeper's house, a single-story frame structure whose end walls are semicircular granite structures, remnants of the older lighthouses.

History
In 1827 the United States Lighthouse Service erected a pair of wooden light towers and a cobblestone keeper's residence on Matinicus Rock. The lights guided sea traffic until 1848 when they were replaced by the granite structure (see picture). Alexander Parris, the architect who designed the 1848 lighthouses, also designed many stone buildings in New England including the 1825 Quincy Market in Boston, Massachusetts.

Matinicus Light is famous for the story of Abbie Burgess, who as a young girl maintained the light for several weeks while her father, the lighthouse keeper, was on the mainland. Winter storms prevented his timely return. Her mother was also very sick.

Matinicus Rock is now fully automated. A diesel generator used for power was replaced by solar panels in 2007. Matinicus Rock is known as being the southernmost nesting site for the Atlantic puffin and as of 2009, the common murre. The Audubon Society often has observers on island during nesting season.

See also

National Register of Historic Places listings in Knox County, Maine

References

Lighthouses completed in 1827
Lighthouses completed in 1846
Lighthouses on the National Register of Historic Places in Maine
Lighthouses in Knox County, Maine
Historic districts on the National Register of Historic Places in Maine
National Register of Historic Places in Knox County, Maine
1827 establishments in Maine